Tsiaras is a surname. Notable people with the surname include: 

Alexander Tsiaras, American photographer, painter, and journalist
Antonis Tsiaras (born 1993), Greek footballer 
Georgios Tsiaras (born 1982), Greek basketball player and manager
Konstantinos Tsiaras (born 1966), Greek politician